Mohamed Moslih (born 11 October 1966) is a former judoka, who represented North Yemen at the 1988 Summer Olympic Games in the extra lightweight class. He finished 19th.

References

External links
 

Judoka at the 1988 Summer Olympics
Olympic judoka of North Yemen
Yemeni male judoka
1966 births
Living people
Place of birth missing (living people)
20th-century Yemeni people